Weimann is a German surname. Notable people with the surname include:

Alexander Weimann (born 1965), German conductor and harpsichordist
Andreas Weimann (born 1991), Austrian footballer
Eugen Weimann, West German slalom canoeist
Gisela Weimann (born 1943), German artist
Gottfried Weimann (1907–1990), German javelin thrower
Joachim Weimann (born 1956), German economist

See also
Weiman

German-language surnames